A Reno Divorce was a 1927 American silent romantic drama film produced and distributed by Warner Bros., Ralph Graves wrote, directed and stars in this film which was the last of the five films he ever directed. The film is now considered lost. Vitaphone discs survive.

Cast
 May McAvoy as Carla
 Ralph Graves as David
 Hedda Hopper as Hedda Frane
 Robert Ober as Eric Frane
 William Demarest as James, the chauffeur
 Anders Randolf as David's father
 Edwards Davis as Judge

See also
 List of early Warner Bros. sound and talking features

References

External links
 
 
 

1927 films
1927 romantic drama films
American romantic drama films
American silent feature films
American black-and-white films
Lost American films
Warner Bros. films
Transitional sound films
1920s American films
Silent romantic drama films
Silent American drama films